The Derbi Senda SM 50 is a 50 cc motorcycle made by Spanish company Derbi.  It is one of the most popular bikes made by Derbi due to its appeal to young riders, its styling and its amazing tuning possibilities. The bike itself uses an EBS/EBE, D50B0 and D50B1 engine which produces a staggering 42bhp. The Derbi Senda is identically constructed as the Gilera SMT 50. Between 1995 and 2005, Derbit was produced with an EBS / EBE engine, and after 2005, D50B0 / D50B1 engines were used.

Fuel capacity: 7.45 liters

References

External links 
 

Senda
Motorcycles introduced in 1995
Dual-sport motorcycles